The Nurses Residence is a building on the Rockefeller University campus in Manhattan, New York City.

References

Buildings and structures in Manhattan
Rockefeller University